The KIMS (Kerala Institute of Medical Sciences) Global is a healthcare organization headquartered in Trivandrum with multi-specialty hospitals and health care centres in South India and the Middle East. The KIMS Global started off as KIMS Hospital, a multi-specialty hospital in Trivandrum, the capital of Kerala. The hospital was launched in 2002 and expanded as the KIMS Global, which went through an expansion in 2013 and obtained centres in other parts of the state: Kollam, Kottayam, Perinthalmanna, and Kochi and well as in the Middle East, in Saudi Arabia, Qatar, Bahrain, Oman, United Arab Emirates, and Dubai.

In India
 KIMS Trivandrum: 650-bed multi-speciality quaternary care hospital with 187 ICU beds.
 KIMS Kottayam: 90 bed hospital with 26 ICU beds
 KIMS Al Shifa, Perinthalmanna: 600 bed tertiary care hospital
 KIMS Wellness Clinic, Trivandrum: 12 doctors across 8 specialties
 KIMS Bibi Hospital: Gynecologic Oncology (Cancer) hospital in Malakpet, Hyderabad
 KIMS Kollam: 100 bed hospital with 20 ICU beds
 KIMS Cancer Centre, Trivandrum: Oncology facility operating in the premises of KIMS Trivandrum
 KIMS Wellness Clinic, Kochi: 8 doctors across 8 specialties

In other countries
Royal Bahrain Hospital (RBH): 60 bed multi-specialty hospital with 7 critical care beds
RBH Medical Centre, Bahrain (RBMC): 7 doctors across 4 specialties (excluding visiting doctors)
 KIMS Bahrain Medical Centre (KBMC): 21 doctors across 12 specialties
 KIMS Qatar Medical Centre, Doha (KQMC): 14 doctors across 11 specialties
 KIMS Oman Hospital, Muscat (KOH): 40 bed hospital with 7 critical care beds
 BRANCH SUNCITYS  Co. LTD. Polyclinic: 28 doctors across 12 specialties
 KIMS Jarir Medical Centre, Riyadh (KMCR): 12 doctors across 7 specialties
 KIMS Medical Centre, Dubai (KMCD): 11 doctors across 8 specialties

References

Hospitals in Thiruvananthapuram
2002 establishments in Kerala
Health care companies of India